{{DISPLAYTITLE:C20H18O11}}
The molecular formula C20H18O11 (molar mass: 434.35 g/mol, exact mass: 434.084911 u) may refer to:

 Avicularin, a flavonol
 Guaijaverin, a flavonol

Molecular formulas